This is a list of singers, bands, composers and other musicians from the province of Quebec.

Blues
 Garou – also pop
 Okoumé – also néo-trad, rock and electronica
 Roxanne Potvin – singer, guitarist
 David Wilcox

Chanson

 Daniel Bélanger – also electronica
 Dan Bigras – also rock
 Daniel Boucher
 Isabelle Boulay – also country and western
 Paul Cargnello – also rock
 Gregory Charles
 Nicola Ciccone
 Leonard Cohen
 Les Colocs – also ska and Africa-inspired music
 Sylvain Cossette
 Cœur de pirate
 Lhasa de Sela
 Marc Déry – also electronica
 Richard Desjardins
 Beau Dommage
 Georges Dor
 Claude Dubois
 Diane Dufresne – also rock
 Dumas – also electronica
 Jean-Pierre Ferland
 Serge Fiori
 Fred Fortin
 Lewis Furey – also rock
 Claude Gauthier
 Harmonium
 Laurence Jalbert
 Pauline Julien
 Pierre Lapointe
 Plume Latraverse
 Carole Laure – also pop
 Daniel Lavoie – also pop
 Jean Leloup – also rock
 Félix Leclerc
 Lynda Lemay
 Marilou – also pop
 Jérôme Minière – also electronica
 Ariane Moffatt – also electronica
 Kevin Parent
 Bruno Pelletier – also rock and jazz
 Marie Denise Pelletier
 Paul Piché
 Ginette Reno
 Michel Rivard
 Alys Robi
 Richard Séguin
 Stefie Shock – also pop and electronica
 Diane Tell
 Gilles Valiquette
 Gilles Vigneault

Classical
 Tim Brady
 Angèle Dubeau
 Charles Dutoit
 André Gagnon
 Marc-André Hamelin
 Jorane
 Louis Lortie
 Montreal Symphony Orchestra
 Kent Nagano
 Yannick Nézet-Séguin 
 André Ristic
 Stéphane Tétreault
 Airat Ichmouratov
 Wonny Song
 Claude Vivier
 Vic Vogel

Country

 Isabelle Boulay – also chanson
 Paul Brunelle
 Terri Clark
 Patricia Conroy
 Willie Lamothe
 Charlie Major
 Marcel Martel

Folk
 La Bolduc
 La Bottine Souriante
 Patricia Conroy
 Les Cousins Branchaud
 Genticorum
 Wade Hemsworth
 Jeremy Fisher
 Anna McGarrigle
 Kate McGarrigle
 Le Rêve du Diable
 Edouard Richard
 Twin Flames (band) 
 Le Vent du Nord
 La Volée d'Castors
 Les Cousins Branchaud

Electronica
 A-Trak
 aKido
 Akufen - a.k.a. Marc Leclair
 Beast
 Daniel Bélanger – also chanson
 E.P. Bergen
 Bran Van 3000
 Champion - a.k.a. Maxime Morin
 Chromeo
 Lili Fatale – also rock
 Tim Hecker
 Kid Koala
 David Kristian
 Lesbians on Ecstasy
 Jérôme Minière – also chanson
 Misstress Barbara
 Scott Montieth, a.k.a. Deadbeat
 Numéro
 Ghislain Poirier – also hip hop
 Ramasutra
 Tiga

Ethnic and multicultural
(origin in parenthesis)
 Afrodizz
 Qurram Hussain
 Josh (South Asian)
 Kashtin (First Nations)
 Zekuhl (African)

Heavy metal
 The Agonist
 Anonymus – thrash metal
 Augury – technical death metal
 Beneath the Massacre – technical death metal
 Beyond Creation – technical death metal
 Blackguard – melodic death metal
 Cryptopsy – technical death metal, deathcore
 Dead Brain Cells - a.k.a. DBC
 Despised Icon – deathcore
 Mike Dyball
 Eudoxis – thrash metal
 Forgotten Tales – power metal
 Gorguts – technical death metal
 Mikey Heppner
 Ion Dissonance – mathcore
 Kataklysm – death metal
 Martyr – Technical death metal
 Mesrine – grindcore
 Neuraxis – technical death metal
 Quo Vadis – technical death metal, melodic death metal
 Slaves on Dope
 Unexpect – avant-garde metal
 Voivod – thrash metal, progressive metal, speed metal

Hip hop
 Anodajay
 Atach Tatuq
 A-Trak
 Criollo
 Dead Obies
 Dubmatique
 Jonathan Emile
 Koriass
 Yvon Krevé
 LMDS – a.k.a. Les Messagers du Son
 Loco Locass
 Muzion
 Ghislain Poirier – also electronica
 Sans Pression
 Shades of Culture
 Sixtoo
 Spek
 Alaclair Ensemble

Humour and irony
 Bowser and Blue
 Crampe en masse
 Yvon Deschamps
 François Pérusse
 Serge Robert - a.k.a. Mononc' Serge, also rock and heavy metal
 Rock et Belles Oreilles

Indie rock
 Arcade Fire – also rock
 Bell Orchestre
Caveboy (band)
 The Franklin Electric
 Fred Fortin
 Half Moon Run
 Karkwa
 The Lovely Feathers
 Malajube
 Men I Trust
 Plants and Animals
 The Stills
 Torngat
 Patrick Watson
 We Are Wolves

Jazz
 Charlie Biddle
 Alain Caron
 Benoît Charest
 Melody Diachun
 Maynard Ferguson
 Oliver Jones
 Florence K
 Ranee Lee
 Oscar Peterson
 Uzeb
 Nikki Yanofsky
 Karen Young
 Rachel Therrien

Musique actuelle
 René Lussier

Néo-trad
 Les Cowboys Fringants
 Mes Aïeux
 Okoumé – also blues, rock and electronica
 Swing

New wave
 Norman Bedard - a.k.a. Norman Iceberg
 The Box
 Corey Hart – also pop
 Men Without Hats – also pop
 Rational Youth
 Trans-X
 World On Edge

Pop
 Véronique Béliveau
 Dominique Blais - also rock
 Joe Bocan
 Dan Boeckner
 Busty and the Bass
 Chantal Chamandy
 Chapter 24
 The Dears
 Cindy Daniel
 Céline Dion
 Lara Fabian
 George Donoso
 Mylene Farmer
 Garou – also blues
 Marc Hamilton
 Corey Hart – also new wave
 Luba
 Thomas Hellman
 Sass Jordan
 Kathleen
 Patrick Krief
 Stéphanie Lapointe
 Carole Laure – also chanson
 Daniel Lavoie – also chanson
 Murray Lightburn
 Loud (rapper)
 Lubalin
 Amanda Mabro
 Marie-Mai
 Marilou – also chanson
 Julie Masse
 Men Without Hats – also new wave
 Mitsou – also electronica
 The New Cities
 Mario Pelchat
 Alexei Perry
 Projet Orange – Britpop, also rock
 Martine St. Clair
 Stefie Shock – also chanson and electronica
 Nathalie Simard
 René Simard
 Simple Plan
 Sky
 Soul Attorneys
 Stars
 Tadros
 Marie-Élaine Thibert
 Gino Vannelli
 Annie Villeneuve
 Roch Voisine
 Martha Wainwright
 Rufus Wainright
 Karl Wolf - also rhythm and blues
 Sara Diamond - also rhythm and blues

Punk
 Banlieue Rouge
 Doughboys
 Grim Skunk
 Groovy Aardvark
 The Nils
 Reset
 Ripcordz
 The Sainte Catherines
 Subb
 Vulgaires Machins
 The 222's

Reggae
 Les Colocs – also chanson and Africa-inspired music

Rock
 Arcade Fire
 Melissa Auf der Maur
 Véronique Béliveau
 The Besnard Lakes
 Dan Bigras – also chanson
 Howard Bilerman
 Dominique Blais - also pop
 Bonjour Brumaire
 Bootsauce
 Daniel Boucher
 Gerry Boulet
 Win Butler
 Xavier Caféïne
 Paul Cargnello - also chanson
 Robert Charlebois
 La Chicane
 Les Chiens
 Corbeau
 The Dears
 Martin Deschamps
 George Donoso
 Duchess Says
 Diane Dufresne – also chanson
 Marc Dupré
 Tim Fletcher
 Lewis Furey – also chanson
 Godspeed You! Black Emperor
 Harmonium
 Kaïn
 Kermess
 Andy Kim
 Spencer Krug
 Kyo
 Steve Lang – bassist (April Wine, Mashmakhan)
 Éric Lapointe – also hard rock
 Jace Lasek
 Ian Lee
 Jean Leloup – also chanson
 Lesbians on Ecstasy – also electronica and punk
 Murray Lightburn
 Lili Fatale – also electronica
 Malajube
 Frank Marino
 Marjo – also chanson
 Efrim Menuck
 Moist
 Katie Moore
 Mystery
 Offenbach
 Okoumé – also néo-trad, blues and electronica
 Liam O'Neil
 Michel Pagliaro
 Paradox
 Bruno Pelletier – also chanson
 Vilain Pingouin
 Priestess
 Projet Orange – Britpop, also rock
 Brendan Reed
 Les Respectables – also pop
 Serge Robert - a.k.a. Mononc' Serge, also humor and heavy metal
 Sam Roberts
 Thee Silver Mt. Zion Memorial Orchestra & Tra-La-La Band
 Marie-Chantal Toupin
 Les Trois Accords
 David Usher
 Vincent Vallières
 Visible Wind
 David Wilcox
 Wolf Parade
 Nanette Workman
 Zébulon

Rhythm and blues
 Corneille
 Luck Mervil
 Karl Wolf - also pop
 Sara Diamond - also pop

Ska, ska punk and ska rock
 The Kingpins
 Me Mom and Morgentaler
 The Planet Smashers
 King Apparatus

Yé-yé
 Pierre Lalonde
 Chantal Renaud

Lyricists
Luc Plamondon

Children's
Annie Broccoli
Carmen Campagne

Miscellaneous
 Chantal Condor
 Erik Mongrain

See also
 Chanson
 Culture of Quebec
 List of Quebec festivals
 List of Quebec record labels
 List of Quebecers
 Music of Quebec
 Néo-trad

References

 Musicians Guild of Montréal. Directory, Musicians' Guild of Montréal, A.F.M. [i.e. American Federation of Musicians], Local 406 = Bottin, Guilde des musiciens de Montréal, F.A.M. [i.e. Féderation américaine des musiciens], Section 406. Montréal: The Guild. N.B.: Yearbook (annuaire).

External links
 BANDEAPART
 Instrumental Folk Music of Quebec
 Québec Info Musique
 Québec Pop

Quebecer
 
Musicians